Charlie Newman (6 December 1920 – 28 August 1991) was  a former Australian rules footballer who played with Collingwood and Melbourne in the Victorian Football League (VFL).

Notes

External links 

1920 births
1991 deaths
Australian rules footballers from Victoria (Australia)
Collingwood Football Club players
Melbourne Football Club players